Clémence Lassalas (born 11 July 1995) is a French actress known for Demain nous appartient.

Filmography

Film 
2005 : Écoute le temps
 2006 : Je déteste les enfants des autres : Colombe
 2014 : La Famille Bélier : Karène

Television 
 Since 2019 : Demain nous appartient : Charlie Molina
 2006 : Je hais les vacances : Camille
 2006 : Carla Rubens (episode Un enfant en otage) :  Élodie
 2005 : Je hais les parents : Camille
 2004 : Le Grand Patron (episode Quarantaine) : Chloé Rocher
 2003 : Je hais les enfants : Camille
 2000 : L'Amour sur un fil

Serie 

 2021 : Emily in Paris (Season 2 - episode 9)

Music video 

 2006 : La Boulette (Diam's)

Advertisements 
 Macif and Nestlé

References

External links 
 
 Clémence Lassalas on L'internaute
 Clémence Lassalas on Agences Artistiques
 Clémence Lassalas on Comme Au Cinéma
 Clémence Lassalas on Film Talent
 Clémence Lassalas on Allociné

French actresses
1995 births
Living people
21st-century French actresses
Place of birth missing (living people)